is a Japanese tennis player.

She has a Malaysian mother and a Japanese father.

Uchijima has career-high WTA rankings of 104 in singles, achieved November 2022, and 121 in doubles, reached in January 2023. She has won seven singles titles and six doubles titles on the ITF Circuit.

Uchijima made her debut on the WTA Tour at the 2018 Japan Women's Open, after receiving a wildcard for the doubles draw, partnering with Erina Hayashi.

For her Grand Slam debut, Uchijima received a wildcard at the 2023 Australian Open.

Grand Slam performance
Only main-draw results in WTA Tour, Grand Slam tournaments, Fed Cup/Billie Jean King Cup and Olympic Games are included in win–loss records.

Singles
Current after the 2023 Thailand Open.

WTA 125 tournament finals

Doubles: 1 (runner-up)

ITF Circuit finals

Singles: 10 (7 titles, 3 runner–ups)

Doubles: 11 (6 titles, 5 runner–ups)

References

External links
 
 
 

2001 births
Living people
Japanese female tennis players
Japanese people of Malaysian descent
Tennis players at the 2018 Asian Games
Asian Games competitors for Japan
21st-century Japanese women